The Atlantic Provinces Economic Council is a Canadian independent, non-partisan research and educational institution founded in 1954 whose objective is to promote the economic development of Atlantic Canada.

It accomplishes this by:

 monitoring and analysing current and emerging economic trends and policies
 communicating the results of this analysis to its members on a regular basis
 consulting with a wide audience
 disseminating its research and policy analyses to business, government and the community at large
 advocating the appropriate public and private sector policy responses

External links
 

Economic research institutes
1954 establishments in Canada
Economy of New Brunswick
Economy of Newfoundland and Labrador
Economy of Nova Scotia
Economy of Prince Edward Island